The Caltech Cosmic Cube was a parallel computer, developed by Charles Seitz and Geoffrey C Fox from 1981 onward. It was the first working hypercube built.

It was an early attempt to capitalise on VLSI to speed up scientific calculations at a reasonable cost. Using commodity hardware and an architecture suited to the specific task (QCD), Fox and Seitz demonstrated that this was indeed possible.

In 1984 a group at Intel including Justin Rattner and Cleve Moler developed the Intel iPSC inspired by the Cosmic Cube.
In 1987 several people in the group formed a company called Parasoft to commercialize the message passing interface developed for the Cosmic Cube.

Characteristics
 64 Intel 8086/87 processors
 128kB of memory per processor
 6-dimensional hypercube network, i. e. each processor can directly exchange data with six other processors.

References

 The Torus Routing Chip
 Parallel Computer Archival Documents
 John Apostolakis, Clive Baillie, Robert W. Clayton, Hong Ding, Jon Flower, Geoffrey C. Fox, Thomas D. Gottschalk, Bradford H. Hager, Herbert B. Keller, Adam K. Kolawa, Steve W. Otto, Toshiro Tanimoto, Eric F. van de Velde, J. Barhen, J. R. Einstein, and C. C. Jorgensen. 1989. "Supercomputer applications of the hypercube"—In Supercomputing systems: architectures, design, and performance, Svetlana P. Kartashev and Steven I. Kartashev (Eds.). Van Nostrand Reinhold Co., New York, NY, USA:1989 Pages 480–577.

External links
 The C Programmer's Abbreviated Guide to Multicomputer Programming

Parallel computing